The Rattlesnakes may refer to:

The Rattlesnakes (1950s band), a British band that evolved into the Bee Gees
Frank Carter & The Rattlesnakes, a British punk band formed in 2015

See also
Rattlesnake (disambiguation)